Duke of Cars is a French noble title that was first created in 1816.

Creation of the title 
Jean-François de Pérusse des Cars was created Lieutenant-General of the Armies on 22 June 1814 and Premier Maître d'hôtel du Roi to King Louis XVIII of France on 23 August 1814. After the death of his eldest brother in March 1814, he was created Count of Cars and brevet Duke of Cars on 9 March 1816. The dukedom was officially registered with the regional Parlement on 29 December 1817.

The 1st Duke died on 10 November 1822 at Tuileries Palace in Paris without male issue. In 1825, the title was renewed on behalf of the son of the Duke's first cousin, Amédée François Régis de Perusse des Cars. Since its renewal, the title has been inherited by a son of the preceding Duke.

List of Dukes of Cars 

The Dukes of Cars since 1816:

Pérusse des Cars estates
 Château des Cars (Haute-Vienne), original seat of the Pérusse des Cars family.
 Château de Montal in Laroquebrou, municipal property, acquired by marriage in 1595 with Rose de Montal.
 Château de Saint-Jean-de-Lespinasse in Saint-Jean-Lespinasse, acquired by marriage in 1591 to Rose de Montal.
 Château de Sourches in Saint-Symphorien (Sarthe), inherited in 1845.
 Château d'Abondant in Abondant (Eure-et-Loir), inherited in 1845, sold in 1902.
 Château de La Roche-de-Bran in Montamisé (Vienne), bought in 1828, destroyed by fire by the Nazis in 1944.
 Château de Beauvais in Lussas-et-Nontronneau (Dordogne), the 17th and 18th centuries.

See also 
 List of French dukedoms
 House of Pérusse des Cars

References
Notes

Sources

External links

Dukes of France
Pérusse des Cars
House of Pérusse des Cars